Rinat Aleksandrovich Yesipenko or Rinat Oleksandrovych Yesipenko (born 22 October 1983) is a former Russian and Ukrainian professional football player.

Club career
He played in the Ukrainian Second League for FC Shakhtar-3 Donetsk in 2001.

References

External links
 

1983 births
Footballers from Luhansk
Living people
Ukrainian footballers
Russian footballers
Association football goalkeepers
FC Shakhtar-2 Donetsk players
FC Shakhtar-3 Donetsk players
FC Moscow players
FC Smena Komsomolsk-na-Amure players
FC Tyumen players
Ukrainian Second League players